The 2011 Football NSW season was the penultimate season under the previous competition format in New South Wales. The competition consisted of four divisions across the State of New South Wales.

League Tables

2011 NSW Premier League

The 2011 NSW Premier League season was played over 22 rounds, beginning on 26 March with the regular season concluding on 28 August 2011.

2011 NSW Super League

The 2011 NSW Super League season was played over 22 rounds, beginning on 12 March with the regular season concluding on 14 August 2011.

NB Two matches were postponed and subsequently couldn't be played.

2011 NSW State League Division 1

The 2011 NSW State League Division 1 season was played over 22 rounds, beginning on 19 March with the regular season concluding on 21 August 2011.

2011 NSW State League Division 2

The 2011 NSW State League Division 2 season was played over 22 rounds, beginning on 12 March with the regular season concluding on 28 August 2011.

NB Two matches were postponed and subsequently couldn't be played.

References

2011 in Australian soccer